Nahor is an unincorporated community in Fluvanna County, in the U.S. state of Virginia.  Nahor's most famous citizen is the late Lindsay Browning, being declared Mayor of Nahor for life.  Nahor is the biblical name for the brother of Abraham.   The Nahor area was once called Mountain View as you could see the Southwest Mountains from there but as trees have grown the past 50 years the mountain view is now obscured.

References

Unincorporated communities in Virginia
Unincorporated communities in Fluvanna County, Virginia